This article gives lists of New Zealand statutes sorted by government.

Chronological list of governments of New Zealand

References

External links 
 New Zealand Legislation, Parliamentary Counsel Office

New Zealand law-related lists